Jacqui Maxwell is an Australian actress best known for playing Annette in The Dukes of Hazzard and various roles in Gilmore Girls.

Notable film appearances
The Dukes of Hazzard (2005) as Annette
Stories of Lost Souls (2001) in the Episode "The Same"

TV appearances
Charmed (2005; one episode) as Vampire Queen
CSI: Crime Scene Investigation (2004: one episode) as Vampire #2, Alice, and Luminessa
24 (2001; six episodes) as Janet York
Gilmore Girls (2001; two episodes) as Summer

References

External links

1981 births
Australian film actresses
Australian television actresses
Living people
Actresses from Sydney